Boyden Cavern is a show cave located in the Giant Sequoia National Monument of the Sequoia National Forest, along the Kings Canyon Scenic Byway in Fresno County, California. It is just west of Kings Canyon National Park.

Cavern
The cave is a solutional cave formed in Mesozoic marble (metamorphosed limestone). It is a cave with many varieties of natural speleothems, including rare "shield" formations.

Tours
Regular tours of the cave are given by a licensed guide company from the last Friday in April to mid November.  The tour includes the Pancake Room, a stalactite group called the Upside Down City, and a flowstone formation called Mother Nature's Wedding Cake. In the Bat Grotto bats spend summer days sleeping. The Drapery Room contains curtains, soda straws and helictites. The tour ends at a small subterranean stream.  of the cave have been mapped.

References

External links
 

Caves of California
Landforms of Fresno County, California
Giant Sequoia National Monument
Show caves in the United States
Tourist attractions in Fresno County, California
Sequoia National Forest